Vincent Dancy is an American football coach, currently a defensive analyst at the University of Colorado. He is the former head football coach at Mississippi Valley State University, a position he has held from 2018 until 2022.

Early years
Dancy played football at Jackson State, where he was an All-Southwestern Athletic Conference (SWAC) performer.

Coaching career
Dancy was the defensive coordinator for one season at Paine College before joining Rick Comegy's staff at Mississippi Valley State University in 2015.

Dancy was named the interim head coach at Mississippi Valley State on November 20, 2017, when the university announced they would not renew Comegy's contract. On January 2, 2018, the "interim" tag was removed from Dancy's name, and he was named the head football coach at Mississippi Valley State.

Head coaching record

References

External links
 Mississippi Valley State profile

Year of birth missing (living people)
Living people
American football linebackers
American football safeties
Jackson State Tigers football coaches
Jackson State Tigers football players
Mississippi Valley State Delta Devils football coaches
Paine Lions football coaches
African-American coaches of American football
African-American players of American football
21st-century African-American sportspeople